Nguyễn Cơ Thạch (15 May 1921 – 10 April 1998; born Phạm Văn Cương) was a Vietnamese revolutionary, diplomat, and politician. He was Foreign Minister of Vietnam from February 1980 to July 1991.
Thạch was seen as pragmatic and influential (given his representation in the Politburo).
His time in office coincided with part of Vietnam’s transition from an ideology-based alignment to the Soviet bloc towards a pragmatic approach to foreign policy, including the primacy of economic over ideological considerations, integration into ASEAN and closer relations with non-socialist countries.
However, Mr Thạch’s efforts to normalize relations with the United States were not successful.

His son Phạm Bình Minh had occupied the same positions held by Thạch, serving as Deputy Prime Minister of Vietnam (2013–2023) and Minister of Foreign Affairs of Vietnam (2011–2021).

References

1921 births
1998 deaths
People from Nam Định province
Cold War diplomats
Alternates of the 5th Politburo of the Communist Party of Vietnam
Members of the 6th Politburo of the Communist Party of Vietnam
Members of the 4th Central Committee of the Communist Party of Vietnam
Members of the 5th Central Committee of the Communist Party of Vietnam
Members of the 6th Central Committee of the Communist Party of Vietnam
Government ministers of Vietnam
Deputy Prime Ministers of Vietnam
Foreign ministers of Vietnam